Berwick is a suburb in Melbourne, Victoria, Australia,  south-east of Melbourne's central business district, located within the City of Casey local government area. Berwick recorded a population of 50,298 at the 2021 census.

It was named by an early leaseholder Robert Gardiner after his birthplace Berwick-on-Tweed in Northumberland.

History

The town of Berwick was originally part of the Cardinia Creek run. Subdivision started in 1854 and a store, post office, hotel and other businesses were established. Wheat, barley and potatoes were grown, with a flour mill operating for several years. Dairy farming and cheese making later became the main activities. The Berwick Agricultural Society, originally started in 1848 as the Mornington Farmers' Society, is one of the oldest farmers' societies in Victoria.

The area grew with the construction of a coach road between Melbourne and the Gippsland region, the Post Office opening on 18 September 1858.

A quarry opened in 1859 to supply ballast for the railway line along the same route, which opened in 1877, and a spur line was constructed to Berwick railway station to transport the metal. The site of the quarry is now occupied by Wilson Botanic Park. From 1861 until 1902, Berwick was also the headquarters of the Shire of Berwick, originally formed as the Berwick Roads Board.

Poplar trees lining the High Street and on into Beaconsfield were planted as an Avenue of Honour to commemorate the fallen in the First World War. Originally name plaques were supposed to have been mounted at the foot of each tree but this was never carried out, despite the plaques being produced.

Late in the 20th century Melbourne sprawled eastward to Berwick. The surrounding rural land was subdivided becoming a popular destination for first home buyers with the population exploding with new housing developments from the 1990s to the 2000s. Some of the character of the original township has remained.

The Berwick Inn

The Berwick Inn on the corner of High Street and Lyall Road, was licensed at Berwick in 1857 as the Border Hotel. The original one-storey section is now the bar. The two-storey section was added in 1877 as the railway approached. The western section was built later in the century. The first licensee was Robert Bain who owned the town's first store and post office and donated the land on which the shire hall was later built.

The Border Hotel was an important local centre in the early days. Aside from being the first pub on the townsite it was also a stopping place for coaches en route to Gippsland, as it involved climbing the hill in Berwick the horses were watered and rested then they stopped at Beaconsfield over the hill to rest after the climb and descent. Bain was the first secretary of the Berwick Roads Board and its initial meetings were held at the hotel from 1862 to 1865. The first local police court was held at the hotel in 1865 and it also served as a licensing court.

The Talia Inn was awarded 'Restaurant of the Year' in 2021.

Demographics 
In the 2016 Census, there were 47,674 people in Berwick. 65.4% of people were born in Australia. The next most common countries of birth were England 4.6%, India 3.5%, Sri Lanka 3.1%, China 2.0% and New Zealand 1.8%. 73.3% of people only spoke English at home. Other languages spoken at home included Mandarin 3.0%, Sinhalese 2.8%, Hindi 1.0%, Italian 0.9% and Arabic 0.9%. The most common responses for religion were No Religion 29.3%, Catholic 25.8% and Anglican 10.6%.

Berwick's census populations have been 60 (1861), 636 (1891), 887 (1954), 25,461, (2001), 36,420 (2006), 44,779 (2011) and 47,674 (2016).

Education

The town's first school, Berwick Primary, was originally established in an old shepherd's hut near the old Berwick hospital in 1857. It was the first school in the Berwick area and school number 40 in Victoria. School buildings were later built on a parcel of land abutting Lyall Rd, between Peel Street and Brisbane Street. The school operated from this site until 2003 when a new school was built in Fairholme Boulevard. Subsequently, the Peel Street site was redeveloped as Pioneer Park, a community open space. The original school buildings were retained during the redevelopment and now operate as a restaurant. Berwick Primary is the only school in Berwick that is using  International Baccalaureate Curriculum.

As well as the State School, a Boys' Grammar School operated from 1882 to 1922. St Margaret's Girls' School (originally called Berwick Presbyterian Girls' School) opened in 1920 with Junior boys being admitted during the 1960s. It ceased providing boarding placement in 1978, being one of the first of the St Margaret's Schools in the world to change.
Berwick Secondary College and Kambrya College, public high schools, and the Berwick campuses of Beaconhills College and St. Francis Xavier College are located in the suburb of Berwick, Victoria. Timbarra P-9 College is located on Parkhill Dr in the Timbarra estate of Berwick.

Victoria's first academically selective co-educational secondary school, Nossal High School, opened in 2010, and is located on the Federation University campus.

Berwick is also home to the third campus of Haileybury, Melbourne, Victoria, with the campus having been simply named 'Edrington', Berwick Lodge Primary School also opened up in 1990, in the suburb. Berwick Fields Primary School opened in 2006 and has an estimated total of 925 students in May 2019, and around March 2012, the total exceeded 1,000 students. Brentwood Park Primary school is located on Bermersyde Drive, adjacent to Kambrya College. 

Chisholm Institute, located at the intersection of Kangan Dr and Clyde Rd, provides TAFE courses and degrees for domestic and international students, with a Technical Education Centre opening in 2009. Chisolm Berwick also run the Casey Tech School, a shared learning facility that delivers programs to secondary schools in the region.

In 2017, Federation University moved into the former Monash University and is located at 100 Clyde Rd, Berwick on the former Casey Airfields. The university is growing rapidly and becoming a part of the community, offering on campus accommodation and other facilities to students. The main areas of study at the Berwick campus are nursing and allied health, IT, education and business.

Employment
59.0% of people living in Berwick are employed full-time, 31.0% employed part-time. Berwick has a lower than average unemployment rate at 5.8% as compared to the Victorian average of 6.6%. People in Berwick also have a higher than median household income, at $1,746 per week. The most common occupations are Professionals 20.6%, Clerical and Administrative Workers 15.9%, Technicians and Trades Workers 14.6%, Managers 13.7%, and Sales Workers 10.9%.

Facilities

Adult education
Berwick also has adult education facilities, including Chisholm Institute of TAFE and a sizable campus of Federation University Australia, formerly a Monash University campus until 2017.

Retail
Berwick has its own large retailers, including a Woolworths supermarket (Berwick Central), 3 Coles supermarkets (Parkhill Plaza, Eden Rise and Berwick Central) and an Aldi (Eden Rise).
Many small shops and businesses are also situated along the shopping precinct on old Princes Highway (Main street of Berwick village). These shops include a selection of restaurants, cafés, and other services including a library, post office & Optometrist (Berwick Optical Centre) which opened in 1979 and is still located in Loveridge Walk. Further south on Clyde Rd is the Eden Rise Shopping Centre which is the largest shopping complex within Berwick. There are a number of car dealerships along the Princes Highway close to Berwick Village and more dealerships on Kangan Drive close to the hospitals.

Transport
Berwick has a railway station and bus terminus situated together along Reserve St. Regular trains travel into Melbourne City and out to Pakenham via Beaconsfield and Officer. V-Line trains also transit through Berwick from the city to Warragul and beyond. Due to a restricted bus infrastructure, Berwick is a fairly car-dependant suburb, with 77.7% of people using a car to travel to work, compared to the Victorian average of 68.3%. The Monash Freeway transits through Berwick taking traffic from the City & Inner Eastern Suburbs out to Warragul, Morwell, Traralgon, Sale, Bairnsdale and Lakes Entrance. Work began in late 2020 to remove the level crossing that crosses Clyde Road adjacent to Enterprise Avenue. This work was completed and Clyde road was re-opened to the public with the new underpass on 21/02/2020 after being closed for access for one month prior so that the vehicle underpass could be completed.

Medical
Berwick currently has 2 hospitals, Casey Public Hospital which is in the process of being extended, with a second St. John of God Berwick Private Hospital, opposite Casey Hospital on Kangan Drive. There are other clinics in the suburb making it mostly self sufficient for all medical needs of the residents.

Housing
In recent years Berwick has come up as one of the premium suburbs of south east as this is one the safest place to live in the victoria. The Berwick suburb boasts of broad roads, large lush green parks, good schools with excellent academic results, good shopping centers and hence housing demand has increased over last few years. The house value in Berwick has a median $713,382 and units are $505,223, which is one of the expensive ones compared to other suburbs.

Sport

The town has an Australian Rules football team competing in the Mornington Peninsula Nepean Football League and an Association football team called Berwick City Football Club.

The town also has a successful cricket club known as the "Wickers" and later changed to the Berwick Bears that compete in the DDCA competition and a tennis club that competes in the BDTA (Berwick & District Tennis Association).

Golfers play at the Montuna Golf Club at Guys Hill approximately 5 km from Berwick Village.

There is also Little Athletics at Edwin Flack Reserve.

Berwick Badminton is open to the public for those who are interested in the sport.

The Berwick Leisure Centre, 79 Manuka Road, is a space inside of the Berwick Secondary College grounds, at which there are Gymnastics running, as well as a Trampolining program. Often, there are other activities, such as karate.

The Hallam Cobras Softball Club Inc have club rooms at Sweeney Reserve, Melzak Way, Berwick

Art 
Berwick is home to the Berwick Viewfinders Camera Club who meet at Berwick Senior Citizens Rooms, 112 High Street, Berwick on scheduled Mondays at 7.30pm.

Media

Berwick is in the coverage range of all the commercial radio stations in Melbourne, yet are also locally serviced by 94.3 Star FM, whose studios are situated in Warragul.

Notable residents

The Berwick Mechanics' Institute and Free Library was built in 1862 at the corner of Peel and Edward Streets. In return for a nominal rent Robert Bain agreed, in 1878, to lease a block of his land to the library for 500 years, so long as a library remained on the property for that period. In 1880 it was moved to its present site in the main street and extended the following year.

Berwick was also the home of Edwin "Teddy" Flack, Australia's first Olympian and Olympic gold medal winner ( and ) at the inaugural Athens Olympic Games. He was laid to rest in Berwick Cemetery, and is commemorated by a statue in the main street. The Edwin Flack Reserve includes several sporting grounds, such as the Edwin Flack Oval, Edwin Flack Athletics Track and Edwin Flack Netball Courts, all named in his honour. They are located alongside Berwick Secondary College.

Richard Casey, later Baron Casey of Berwick and Governor-General of Australia was a resident of Berwick. His home of Edrington has now been converted to an aged care facility.

Scott McDonald, Australian International football (soccer) player, striker for Celtic FC in Scotland and top scorer in the Scottish Premier League in the 2007–08 season grew up in Berwick.

Former AFL games record holder Michael Tuck and former Hawthorn defender Mark Graham hail from Berwick as does 2009 number one draft pick Tom Scully and Brisbane Lions ruckman Stefan Martin and Defender and Coach, Justin Leppitsch (2014-2016), Assistant Coach to Richmond (2016-Present).

Volunteering
There are many opportunities to become a member of a volunteer organisation in Berwick. Volunteer organisations include The Berwick Lioness Club and Rotary.

See also

 City of Berwick – Berwick was previously within this former local government area.
 Berwick railway station

References

Books
Beaumont, N.E. "Early days of Berwick and its surrounding districts of Beaconsfield, Upper Beaconsfield, Harkaway, Narre Warren and Narre Warren North". 3rd ed. 1979.
Berwick-Pakenham Historical Society. "In the wake of the pack tracks: a history of the Shire of Berwick, now the City of Berwick and the Shire of Pakenham". 1982.
Wells, J.C. "Berwick: some aspects". 1980.
	 

Suburbs of Melbourne
Suburbs of the City of Casey
1854 establishments in Australia